The 1999 IAAF Grand Prix Final was the fifteenth edition of the season-ending competition for the IAAF Grand Prix track and field circuit, organised by the International Association of Athletics Federations. It was held on 11 September at the Olympic Stadium in Munich, Germany.

Bernard Barmasai (3000 metres steeplechase) and Gabriela Szabo (3000 metres) were the overall points winners of the tournament. A total of 18 athletics events were contested, ten for men and eight for women.

Medal summary

Men

Women

References

IAAF Grand Prix Final. GBR Athletics. Retrieved on 2015-01-17.

External links
IAAF Grand Prix Final archive from IAAF

Grand Prix Final
Grand Prix Final
International athletics competitions hosted by Germany
Sports competitions in Munich
1980s in Munich
IAAF Grand Prix Final
September 1999 sports events in Europe